Jvara, also called Jvarasura, is the personification of fever in Hindu tradition. He is the consort, and sometimes the attendant, of the pox-goddess, Shitala.

Hinduism

When Shiva was not invited to Daksha's yajna, his wife, Sati, was swept by sorrow. Observing the unease of his wife, Shiva's third eye issued a drop of sweat, and a fearful creature emerged out of the sweat, gleaming like a flame. The creature was dwarfish, with penetrating eyes, donning a green moustache, with hair standing erect on his head and body, looking like hybrid of a hawk and an owl, jet-black in hue, and was dressed in a blood-coloured cloth. He named the creature Jvara, and the creature proceeded to cause a fever to all the devas.  

Once, Vishnu was inflicted with the fever of Jvarasura, when in the form of Hayagriva. He then killed the fever-demon by cutting him into three pieces using his discus, the Sudarshana Chakra. However, Jvarasura was later revived by Brahma, who joined the three parts. But, by that time, each three parts had grown a head and a limb. Thus, Jvarasura is depicted as having three faces, three feet, and remarkable ability to move in all directions at once. He was later selected as servant of the pox-goddess, Shitala.

Cult 
The cult of Shitala-Jvarasura is widely popular in Bengali culture. Incidentally, in Bengali, Oriya and Hindi languages, fever is referred to as Jvara. and Asura means demon. The name Jvarasura is combination of these two words - Jvara (meaning fever) and Asura (meaning demon) - Jvarasura. Thus, Jvarasura means the demon of fever. Jvarasura is disguised as a young servant. Shitala, the consort of Jvarasura is widely worshipped by village folk in whole of North India, as a protector of pox and fever diseases.

Buddhism
In Buddhist tradition, Jvarasura is depicted sometimes as consort of Paranasabari, the Buddhist goddess of diseases. In some images, these deities are shown as flying away, to escape from wrath of Vajrayogini, the Buddhist goddess and destroyer of diseases.

See also
Febris; goddess of fever in Roman mythology

References

Hindu folk deities
Tibetan Buddhist mythology
Asura
Plague gods